Balagannakh (Balağannaax) is a rural locality (a selo), one of three settlements, in addition to Khorintsy and Mekimdya, in Khorinsky Rural Okrug of Olyokminsky District in the Sakha Republic, Russia. Its population as of the 2002 Census was 76.

Geography
The town is located on the left bank of the Lena River near the mouth of the Namana, originating in the Lena Plateau.

References

Notes

Sources
Official website of the Sakha Republic. Registry of the Administrative-Territorial Divisions of the Sakha Republic. Olyokminsky District. 

Rural localities in Olyokminsky District